Erich Hotopf (born 14 October 1909, date of death unknown) was a German sports shooter. He competed in the 50 m rifle event at the 1936 Summer Olympics.

References

1909 births
Year of death missing
German male sport shooters
Olympic shooters of Germany
Shooters at the 1936 Summer Olympics
Place of birth missing